Copromorpha gypsota is a moth in the Copromorphidae family. It is found on Fiji and has a wingspan of 26-30mm.

References

Natural History Museum Lepidoptera generic names catalog

Copromorphidae
Moths described in 1886